The Pendang District is a town, a district and a parliamentary constituency in Kedah, Malaysia. The district is primarily covered with paddy fields with agriculture being its main economic activity. Pendang town is about 20 km from state capital Alor Setar.

History
Historically, Pendang was one of the largest breeding grounds for the elephants used to transport tributary goods to Thailand.
Pendang was previously part of Alor Setar, and was contested as Kota Star Selatan until the 1980s. Pendang became a district in its own right in February 1975.

Administrative divisions

Pendang District is divided into 8 mukims, which are:
 Air Puteh
 Bukit Raya
 Guar Kepayang
 Padang Kerbau
 Padang Peliang
 Padang Pusing
 Rambai
 Tobiar

Demographics

Federal Parliament and State Assembly Seats 

List of Pendang district representatives in the Federal Parliament (Dewan Rakyat) 

List of Pendang district representatives in the State Legislative Assembly (Dewan Undangan Negeri)

Tourist attractions
There is a famous Pendang Lake Recreational & Resort near the Pendang town centre. Other major attractions include Masjid Pendang, Stadium Mini Pendang and night market.

Transportation

Car
The main road in the constituency is Jalan Raja Hasrul Raja Hassan, said to be the longest municipal named road in Kedah state – up to 85 kilometers. PLUS  exit 175 serves Pendang town.

Public transportation
KTM Kobah is the only railway station serving Pendang constituency, providing ETS/Intercity and Komuter services.

References

External links

JPN Website

 
Populated places in Kedah